(stylized in all caps) is an arcade rhythm game developed and published by Sega. It was demonstrated first in some Japanese arcades in November 2014, and was officially released on 16 July 2015.

In a livestream on 20 October 2021, Sega announced that they will reboot the CHUNITHM series and make a new game called “CHUNITHM NEW” with style based on the original "CHUNITHM". Along with "CHUNITHM NEW", new cabinets are also released along with the new game. Many new features and improvements were made to the new machine, such as:
 120fps monitor
 Upgraded speaker, earphone jack, and touch panels
 Digital payment support
 Avatar and arena battle
 Level adjustments, extending from level 14 to level 15.
These new cabinets are called "Gold Model" while old cabinets are now called "Silver Model. Old "Silver Model" cabinets can be converted using conversion kits to run "CHUNITHM NEW".

Gameplay 
In Chunithm, players use touch and motion-based sensor bars to input commands that correspond to the notes scrolling down from the top of the screen. Depending on the type of note, players may be required to tap, hold, or slide their fingers against the bottom sensor bar or wave their hands in the air between the sensors located on either side of the machine. 

 TAP: These are notes that you tap when it is within the judgement line. It is colored red. ExTAP, a variation of the TAP note, will always be hit as "JUSTICE CRITICAL" when hit.
 HOLD: These are notes that you hold when it reaches the judgement line. HOLD notes don't have a release timing. You can still release after the note is done.
 SLIDE: These notes are similar to the HOLD notes. This is simply a HOLD note that could move either left or right. 
 AIR: These notes have two types, an upward AIR note and a downward AIR note, the latter being exclusive to the "MASTER" difficulty. Upward AIR notes can be followed by an AIR-HOLD notes similar to regular HOLD notes where the player has to keep their hand in the air until it ends. There also exist AIR-ACTION notes where you have notes that you have to swing your hands to hit. 
 FLICK: Exclusive to the "MASTER" difficulty and "WORLD'S END". These notes are similar to TAP notes. Tap and flick the note when it appears.
 DAMAGE: Exclusive to "WORLD'S END". These are notes where tapping will result in a "MISS" judgement. Missing the note will result in a "JUSTICE CRITICAL".

CHUNITHM NEW introduces two new AIR note types.

 AIR-SLIDE: These notes are similar to AIR-HOLD and SLIDE notes. This is simply an AIR-HOLD and SLIDE notes combined. 
 AIR-CRUSH: These are notes that are like AIR-ACTION notes but can exist without AIR-HOLD.

Release 

The first version of Chunithm released outside of Japan, "CHUNITHM SUPERSTAR", is expected to be released at certain dates at different countries. "CHUNITHM SUPERSTAR" is based on "CHUNITHM STAR" that was released back in 2017.

"CHUNITHM SUPERSTAR PLUS" was released on September 2, 2021 via an online update. This new version added the following to the game:

Course Mode
WORLD'S END
CHUNITHM NEW International Version was announced on February 22, 2022. It was released on 3 March 2022. Due to differences with the Japanese version, data will still be separated.

The launch dates, its countries/areas, and the version first released in these countries/areas are:

Singapore: November 26, 2020 (CHUNITHM SUPERSTAR)
Taiwan: November 27, 2020 (CHUNITHM SUPERSTAR)
 Hong Kong: December 2, 2020 (CHUNITHM SUPERSTAR)
 Macau: December 3, 2020 (CHUNITHM SUPERSTAR) 
Korea: December 9, 2020 (CHUNITHM SUPERSTAR)
Australia: February 2, 2021 (CHUNITHM SUPERSTAR) 
New Zealand: March 27, 2021 (CHUNITHM SUPERSTAR) 
Thailand: April 3, 2021 (CHUNITHM SUPERSTAR) 
Mainland China: September 8, 2022 (CHUNITHM NEW)

Malaysia: October 12, 2022 (CHUNITHM NEW PLUS)Philippines: October 31, 2022 (CHUNITHM NEW PLUS)In addition, many Round1 locations in the United States feature CHUNITHM PARADISE LOST'' cabinets. However, these cabinets are offline, and have a limited selection of songs.

Notes

References

2015 video games
Music video games
Arcade video games
Arcade-only video games
Japan-exclusive video games
Video games developed in Japan
Sega arcade games